William Brydges may refer to:

William Brydges, 20th-century Canadian murder suspect
William Brydges, 4th Baron Chandos (1552–1602), English peer and politician
William Bridges-Maxwell (1929–1992), Australian politician
William Bridges Adams (1797–1872), British author and inventor
William Brydges (organist) (1775–1835), English organist and composer

See also
William Bridges (disambiguation)